Victor Hănescu was the defending champion but decided not to participate.
7th seed Oleksandr Nedovyesov defeated 8th seed Pere Riba 6–2, 7–5

Seeds

  Albert Montañés (first round)
  Pablo Andújar (quarterfinals)
  Guillaume Rufin (second round, retired)
  Thomaz Bellucci (withdrew)
  Diego Sebastián Schwartzman (semifinals)
  Dustin Brown (second round)
  Oleksandr Nedovyesov (champion)
  Pere Riba (final)
  Rik de Voest (first round)

Draw

Finals

Top half

Bottom half

References
 Main Draw
 Qualifying Draw

Pekao Szczecin Open - Singles
2013 Singles
2013 in Polish tennis